

Dowlingville is a locality in the Australian state  of  South Australia located on the east coast of Yorke Peninsula immediately adjoining Gulf St Vincent about  north-west of the state capital of Adelaide.  
Its boundaries were created in May 1999.

The name of the locality is considered to have been derived from a Mr G.P. Dowling Whittaker who was an early resident.  In 1904 it was described as The locality contains the historic former Dowlingville Post Office, which is listed on the South Australian Heritage Register.

As of 2014, the majority land use within the locality is “primary production.”

Dowlingville is located within the federal division of Grey, the state electoral district of Narungga and the local government area of the Yorke Peninsula Council.

See also
List of cities and towns in South Australia

References

Towns in South Australia
Yorke Peninsula